Blek is a 2013 puzzle video game.

Blek may also refer to:
 Blek le Rat, a French graffiti artist
 Mary Leigh Blek, an American gun control advocate
 Il Grande Blek, an Italian comic book